George Robert Armstrong (August 1, 1819 – April 20, 1896) was a pioneer mayor of Omaha, Nebraska. He served as the interim Mayor of Omaha from 1858 to 1859 after Andrew Jackson Poppleton resigned, and was elected in 1861, only to resign in 1862.

See also

 History of Omaha

References

1819 births
1896 deaths
Mayors of Omaha, Nebraska
Burials at Prospect Hill Cemetery (North Omaha, Nebraska)
19th-century American politicians